Felipe Cazals (28 July 1937 – 16 October 2021) was a Mexican film director, screenwriter, and producer. His wife was Rosa Eugenia Báez de Cazals.

Together with Arturo Ripstein, Cazals was considered in Mexico one of the most representative film directors of his generation. With his films  (1986), Las Poquianchis (1976), El Apando (1976), and Canoa (1976), he was considered to be one of the most creative and bitter-critical filmmakers in the history of Latin American movies. Canoa was entered into the 26th Berlin International Film Festival, where it won the Silver Bear - Special Jury Prize. His 1973 film Aquellos años was entered into the 8th Moscow International Film Festival where it won a Special Prize.

Filmography
 Ciudadano Buelna (2012)
 Chico Grande (2010)
 Las Vueltas del citrillo (2006)
 Digna... hasta el último aliento (2004)
 Su alteza serenísima (2000), His Most Serene Highness (International: English title)
 Kino (1993)
 Desvestidas y alborotadas (1991)
 Burbujas de amor (1991)
 La Furia de un dios (1987)
  (1986)
 Testimonios de la revolución (1986) [TV Series]
 El Tres de copas (1986)
 La Dama solitaria (1985) [TV Series]
 Damian (1985) [TV Series]
 Dulce espiritu (1985) [TV Series]
 La Habitación que silva (1985) [TV Series]
 Pesadilla (1985) [TV Series]
 Los Motivos de Luz (1985)
 Centenario (1984)
 Bajo la metralla (1983)
 El Qué sabe, sabe (1983) [TV Series]
 Siete cucas, Las (1981)
 El Gran triunfo (1981)
 Rigo es amor (1980)
 El Año de la Peste (1979)
 La Guera Rodríguez (1978)
 Las Poquianchis (1976)
 The Heist (1976)
 Canoa (1976)
 Investigación cientifica (1975)
 Testimonios y documentos; Paro agrario (1975)
 Los que viven donde el viento sopla suave (1974)
 Aquellos años (1973)
 The Garden of Aunt Isabel (1971)
 Emiliano Zapata (1970)
 Familiaridades (1969), Familiarities (International: English title)
 La Manzana de la discordia (1968), The Apple of Discord (International: English title)
 Alfonso Reyes (1965)
 Leonora Carrington o el sortilegio ironico (1965)
 Mariana Alcoforado (1965)
 La Otra guerra (1965)
 Que se callen... (1965)

Awards
Berlin international film festival, Silver Berlin Bear, 1976

1974, Bilbao International Festival of Documentary and Short Films, First prize

San Sebastián International Film Festival, Silver seashell, 1986

Trieste Festival of Latin-American Cinema, 2005, Career achievement awards

References

External links
 

1937 births
2021 deaths
Film directors from Mexico City
Mexican film directors
Mexican film producers
Mexican people of French descent
Ariel Award winners
Best Director Ariel Award winners
Golden Ariel Award winners
20th-century Mexican people
21st-century Mexican people